The Keihan Hai (Japanese 京阪杯) is a Grade 3 horse race for Thoroughbreds aged three and over, run in November over a distance of 1200 metres on turf at Kyoto Racecourse.

It was first run in 1956 and has held Grade 3 status since 1984. The race was originally run over 2000 metres and was contested over 2200 metres in 1996 before being cut to 1800 metres a year later. It was first run over its current distance in 2006.

Winners since 2000

Earlier winners

 1984 - Katsuragi Ace
 1985 - Marubutsu Sir Pen
 1986 - Single Roman
 1987 - Maruma Seiko
 1988 - Tosho Leo
 1989 - Nihon Pillow Brave
 1990 - Long Muteki
 1991 - Ikuno Dictus
 1992 - Mr Spain
 1993 - Longchamp Boy
 1994 - Nehai Caesar
 1995 - Dantsu Seattle
 1996 - Dance Partner
 1997 - Erimo Dandy
 1998 - Bravo Green
 1999 - Rosado

See also
 Horse racing in Japan
 List of Japanese flat horse races

References

Turf races in Japan